Vicente de Espona (24 March 1918 – 23 October 1995) was a Spanish painter and sculptor. He was born in Valencia, but completed the majority of his work in São Paulo, Marbella, and San Pedro de Alcántara, where many of his public works are displayed today. 

Prior to his career as an artist, de Espona worked as a consulting lawyer at the Banco Popular Español in Barcelona. In 1950, he requested a leave of absence from the bank to move to Brazil, where he dedicated his life to artistic pursuits.

Works

De Espona's publicly-displayed work is primarily located in São Paulo, Marbella, and San Pedro de Alcántara.

São Paulo 
De Espona lived in São Paulo, Brazil, from 1957 to 1968. During this period, he produced paintings, sculptures, and engravings. In Brazil, de Espona conducted two annual art exhibitions which were held in various cities. De Espona's art studio in the city was later opened to the public.

During his time in Brazil, de Espona also completed freelance work with international advertising agencies and illustrated books and magazine covers. One of his projects was chosen as part of a building contest at the Igapó lakeside, a large summer residence which came to be called a "Spiritual Retreat". For this project, he created a large stone mural 125 square meters in size at the entrance of Londrina.

Marbella
Between 1971 and 1995 de Espona worked in Marbella. Many of his public works are installed in the streets and squares of the city. These works include a throne dedicated to Jesus for a confraternity in Marbella, which was made of wood and bronze. He created a sculptural mural for the House of Culture of Marbella, called Marbella sun. He also created the Andalusia Memorial, whose central obelisk stands 6 feet tall. Other works, although not as monumental as the previous ones, also had their place in the architecture for the municipality of Marbella, include a mural on the facade of the Parish of Nueva Andalucía building and a six-meter-tall mural on the Gimnasio Atenas, called Auto Modelación.

San Pedro Alcántara (Málaga)
De Espona's sculpture Síntesis (English: synthesis) measures 12 meters high and is located in San Pedro de Alcántara. Síntesis represents the patron saint San Pedro de Alcántara and was originally located in the plaza of the church. The work was transferred in the early 1990s to the edge of the main road, at the junction adjacent to the Avenida del Mediterráneo. In 2008 it was removed due to the danger it posed to highway workers, and was abandoned for two years. However, in 2010 it was restored, repainted, repaired, and placed in the Teodoro García Díez roundabout next to Ronda Road and the industrial area of the city, welcoming visitors who come to San Pedro by the A357 in Spain.

De Espona's sculpture Return of the Olivar, is also located in Malaga. The piece depicts a family, with one family member riding on a donkey. It is much smaller than Síntesis and is located in the gardens of the famous palm grove of San Pedro de Alcántara, south of Marqués del Duero. It was also in a state of disrepair for some years, until 2008 when it was finally repaired and restored.

References 

People from Valencia
1918 births
1995 deaths
Spanish expatriates in Brazil
Spanish painters
Spanish sculptors